Children Playtime is a Philippine game show on Kapamilya Channel network hosted by Luis Manzano. Prior to Manzano, the show was hosted by Billy Crawford before dropping due to some issues regarding the time-slot. it premiered on Kapamilya Channel on February 4, 2023. The show features the kids playing party games. It originally aired on Weekends at 6:00 AM (PST), but on September 17, 2015, it was moved to Saturdays at 10:30 AM to give way for Dance Kids, however the following week, it traded timeslots with Failon Ngayon. On August 18, 2024, it started airing on Sundays, replacing Luv U.
This show currently airs every Saturday and Sunday at 4:30 PM (PST) on Jeepney TV.

Hosts
 Billy Crawford (episodes 1-7)
 Luis Manzano (episodes 8-38)

Band
 Six Part Invention

Guest co-hosts
 Robi Domingo  (episode 8)
 Alex Gonzaga  (episode 8)

Format
This show was similar to Hollywood Game Night.

Original
Each week, two teams of celebrity players will play three house party games to earn points for their team. After the third game, the team with the most points wins 100,000 pesos. This team advances to the bonus round, where they can take home an additional prize up to 200,000 pesos. These teams are playing on a road to five playoffs. The first team to enter the fifth jackpot rounds will be declared the defending champion, and will be playing against another team.

Updated
Two teams consisting of eight celebrity contestants will play various house party games to earn 100,000 pesos. In minigames, if contestants are performing better, or otherwise correct, the team will earn one to two people depending on game. If they perform worse, or otherwise are wrong, the other team may steal, at most, games. They are given limited time per game. After three games, the points are counted, and the team with most points will win 100,000 pesos, and will be eligible for the jackpot round. In the jackpot round, the minigame is always Lights, Camera, Act-song!, and one has to guess the song by seeing the contestants' actions, and the noise-cancelling headphones have to be worn. The winning individual will win up to 300,000 pesos, depending on streak.

Segments

Team Minigames

Note: The list is incomplete, you may help to add more.

Jackpot Round 
(♪) Lights, Camera, Act-song!: One contestant has to wear noise-cancelling headphones, and then he/she has to guess what song they are song by seeing the contestants' actions. 2 minutes are given.

Celebrities appeared on the show

Team Ka-Familiar vs Team DEEL

Team Ka-Familiar vs KomedyanTeam

Team Ka-Familiar vs Team Beauty

Note: Team Beauty supposed to play again for another week. However, they decided to quit the game after Ryan's personal reason which urged them to quit the show

Team Ka-Familiar vs Team Building

Team Ka-Familiar vs Team Chiu

Team Ka-Familiar vs Team Shorties

Note: Team Ka-Familiar has entered the hall of fame, new set of teams will replace.

Team 90's vs Team Pasion

Note: Team Pasion was supposed to play again for another week but they decided to quit for personal reasons.

Team 90's vs Di MaaTeam

Team 90's vs Team Queens

Team 90's vs Team Summer Babes

Note: The 37th and final episode is a special episode for the exhibition game.

See also
 List of programs broadcast by ABS-CBN

References

ABS-CBN original programming
Philippine game shows
2015 Philippine television series debuts
2016 Philippine television series endings
Filipino-language television shows